Joseph Jones (20 April 1916 – 11 January 1974) was a Welsh rugby union and professional rugby league footballer who played in the 1930s, 1940s and 1950s.

Background
Joe Jones was born in Cilfynydd, Wales, and he died aged 57 in Barrow-in-Furness, Cumbria, England.

Playing career

International honours
Joe Jones won 15 caps for Wales (RL) in 1940–1949 while at Wigan and Barrow, and won a cap for Great Britain (RL) while at Barrow in 1946 against New Zealand.

Championship final appearances
Joe Jones played  in Wigan's 13–9 victory over Dewsbury in the Championship Final first-leg during the 1943–44 season at Central Park, Wigan on Saturday 13 May 1944 (Jim Sullivan played  in the second-leg).

County League appearances
Joe Jones played in Wigan's victory in the Lancashire County League during the World War II affected 1940–41 season.

Challenge Cup Final appearances
Joe Jones was a non-playing reserve to travel in Barrow's 0–10 defeat by Wigan in the 1950–51 Challenge Cup Final during the 1950–51 season at Wembley Stadium, London on Saturday 5 May 1951.

Club career
Joe Jones changed rugby football codes from rugby union to rugby league when he transferred from Cilfynydd RFC to Wigan during 1936, he made his début for Wigan in the 5-14 defeat by Warrington at Wilderspool Stadium, Warrington on Saturday 7 November 1936, he scored his first try for Wigan in the 8-0 victory over Batley at Mount Pleasant, Batley on Saturday 17 December 1938, he scored his last try for Wigan in the 25-3 victory over Oldham in the Challenge Cup 1 round 2 leg at Central Park, Wigan on Saturday 18 March 1944, he played his last match for Wigan in the 0-8 defeat by Bradford Northern in the Challenge Cup Final 2 leg at Odsal Stadium, Bradford on Saturday 22 April 1944, he transferred from Wigan to Barrow during 1944.

References

External links
!Great Britain Statistics at englandrl.co.uk (statistics currently missing due to not having appeared for both Great Britain, and England)
(archived by web.archive.org) Back on the Wembley trail
Photograph of Joe Jones
Search for "Joseph Jones" at britishnewspaperarchive.co.uk
Search for "Joe Jones" at britishnewspaperarchive.co.uk

1916 births
1974 deaths
Barrow Raiders players
Cilfynydd RFC players
Footballers who switched code
Great Britain national rugby league team players
Rugby league centres
Rugby league five-eighths
Rugby league fullbacks
Rugby league locks
Rugby league players from Rhondda Cynon Taf
Rugby league utility players
Rugby union players from Cilfynydd
Wales national rugby league team players
Welsh rugby league players
Welsh rugby union players
Wigan Warriors players